Care Bears: Unlock the Magic is an animated children's television series and the sixth television series based on the Care Bears franchise, following Care Bears and Cousins.

The series follows the adventures of Good Luck, Funshine, Cheer, Grumpy, and Share Bear as they go on a mission to protect the land of the Silver Lining. The series premiered on Boomerang's streaming service on February 1, 2019, the television channel on March 30, 2019, and on Cartoon Network on April 16, 2019. On May 20, 2022, it was announced six new specials were ordered and will air on Cartoonito and HBO Max, where it had been airing since 2021.

Plot
Care Bears: Unlock the Magic follows the adventures of good friends Good Luck, Funshine, Cheer, Grumpy, and Share Bear, as they embark from their life in Care-A-Lot on a new adventure through the Silver Lining, a strange world neighbored by the Whiffles, who are a group of innocently happy creatures that plant seeds to keep the magical land of Care-A-Lot and the neighboring Silver Lining growing. The Care Bears spread caring and sharing throughout the land as they learn to rely on their friendship, courage, and use a bit of their belly badge power.

However, the ego-driven nemesis of the Care Bears, Bluster and his Bad Crowd, try to stop them from succeeding at their mission, as his goal is to turn the Silver Lining into Blusterland. The Care Bears also retrieve help through the Caring Tower from their friends Bedtime, Tenderheart, and Wish Bear. Dibble the Whiffle accompanies the Care Bears along the way.

The Care Bears are sent on the road for the first time in this series, as they explore wonderful and never-before-seen areas that surround Care-A-Lot called the Silver Lining. Due to this, they meet new creatures and employ their powers and wits.

Characters

Main
 Cheer Bear (voiced by Debi Derryberry, under the alias Alex Hall) is the leader of the group and the pilot of the Cloudseeker. She is a positive go-getter and is always up for a challenge.
 Grumpy Bear (voiced by Nick Shakoour) is the team mechanic and resident worrywart. He is flippant and smart-alecky, but deep inside is a kind-hearted Care Bear who is tone deaf to his own words.
 Funshine Bear (voiced by Justin Michael) is the co-pilot of the Cloudseeker. He is blindly optimistic.
 Share Bear (voiced by Brenna Larsen) is the team communicator. She talks to animals, loves to bake, and also loves connecting with everyone.
 Good Luck Bear (voiced by Patrick Pedraza) is the mission's navigator. He tackles every task with determination and is determined to succeed by himself with no luck involved.
 Dibble (voiced by Brenna Larsen) is the team's pet and companion. She communicates through limited words, coos, and sounds. While it is difficult to understand what she is saying, it is apparent what she is feeling. She is as eager as a puppy and curious as a kitten.

The Bad Crowd
The Bad Crowd consists of many members, although only four are named. They are led by Bluster to plant the Bad Seeds, and are junior league yes-men toadying up to Bluster and his plans to expand Blusterland.
 Bluster (voiced by Jason LaShea), the ego-driven, annoying, narcissistic leader of the Bad Crowd and the main antagonist of the series. He is an adolescent prankster and irredeemably mischievous. His plan is to change the Silver Lining into a land of his own, Blusterland.
 Robbie (voiced by voiced by Debi Derryberry, under the alias Alex Hall), Bluster's assistant.
 Malcom (voiced by Justin Michael), a member of the Bad Crowd who dreams of taking over Bluster as the leader.

Recurring
 Tenderheart Bear (voiced by Nick Shakoour) is the anchor. He supports the crew from afar through the Caring Tower. He is kind, wise, and fatherly.
 Wish Bear (voiced by Valarie Rae Miller) is the mission's "mom". She is practical, supportive, and full of wisdom.
 Bedtime Bear (voiced by Harry Chaskin) is the night watch. He is a night owl who loves to read books, and is the enthusiastic scholar and the team's "search engine".
 The Whiffles, magical creatures who serve the Silver Lining by planting Seeds of Caring. Dibble is one of these creatures.

Minor
 Love-a-Lot Bear (voiced by Debi Derryberry, under the alias Alex Hall), a member of the Care Bears.
 Harmony Bear, another member of the Care Bears.
 Gus and Garath (voiced by Justin Michael and Harry Chaskin respectively), two gnomes who used to be greedy and hogged things, but learned to be nice and share things together, much to their uncle's dismay.
 Plunk (voiced by Harry Chaskin) a former member of the Bad Crowd who was kicked out of the group by Bluster for being too nice, and now wants to do as much good as possible.

Unlock the Music
 Wonderheart Bear, a magenta Care Bear cub, who first appeared in the music video "Best Wishes", since her first appearance in "Care Bears: Welcome to Care-a-Lot".
 Togetherness Bear, a Care Bear who first appeared in the music video "Togetherness".
 Secret Bear, a Care Bear who first appeared in the music video "Best Friends".
 Best Friend Bear, a Care Bear who also first appeared in the music video "Best Friends".
 Birthday Bear
 Hopeful Heart Bear

Production
Care Bears: Unlock the Magic is co-produced for Boomerang by Cloudco Entertainment and Copernicus Studios. The president of the former, Sean Gorman, has said that "[they] swung for the fences to give the Care Bears the best and most compelling storytelling, animation and broadcaster home."

Episodes

Shorts

Cloudco Shorts (2019)
20 shorts were produced for the Care Bears YouTube channel. These are used during the end credits when Unlock the Magic is broadcast on Boomerang.

Care Bears: Unlock the Music
Care Bears: Unlock the Music is a series of original music videos uploaded onto the official Care Bears YouTube channel, which uses clips from Unlock the Magic. The series co-owned and globally distributed by Moonbug Entertainment, a YouTube management company for children.

On February 26, 2021, Cloudco released Care Bears Kids Hits: Vol. 1 on digital download, which contains 10 of the songs featured in Unlock the Music. On March 12, 2021, Cloudco released another digital download album featuring the complete first wave of Unlock the Music songs. Many of the songs have also been released as singles as well.

On May 8, 2021, the second wave of songs from Unlock the Music began to be uploaded on the channel. Season 2 will feature 20 brand new songs, with all-new Care Bears featured.

On August 5, 2022, Cloudco released Care Bears Dance Party on digital download, which contains 10 of the songs featured in the second season of Unlock the Music. On September 2, 2022, Cloudco released another digital download album featuring the complete first wave of Unlock the Music songs titled Unlock the Music, Season 2. As with Season 1, many of the songs have also been released as singles as well.

Season 1 (2020-21)

Season 2 (2021)

Season 3 (2022)

Broadcast

Original broadcasters
Care Bears: Unlock the Magic was co-commissioned by Turner and Tiny Pop, and so the series was first broadcast in the United States and the United Kingdom.
 
In the United States, the 10 episodes of Care Bears: Unlock the Magic were released to Boomerang's mobile app service on February 1, 2019. A sneak peek release of the first episode was added early to the app on January 28, 2019. The series premiered on the main TV network on March 30, and premiered on Cartoon Network on April 16, 2019. On August 16, 2021, it was announced that the series would air on the Cartoonito block as a weekend programme beginning on September 19, 2021.

International
In the United Kingdom, the series premiered on Tiny Pop on April 6, 2019. Unlock the Music premiered on Sky Kids on February 13, 2023.

On September 30, 2019, Cloudco Entertainment announced they had sold the series on to many broadcasters including WildBrain's Family Jr. in Canada. On the same day, Cloudco also announced that Bomanbridge Media would be the content agent for the series in Southeast Asia, with the two selling the show to TVB in Hong Kong and ABS-CBN's Yey! in The Philippines.

Later foreign deals that would go into 2020 would include StarzPlay in Arabia, among others.

In Latin America, the series was released on Paramount's mobile app service, Noggin on April 1, 2020. It later aired on Nickelodeon and Nick Jr. channels on July 6, 2020.

In Brazil, the series first began airing on Globo's streaming service, Globoplay on September 18, 2020. It was later shown on Gloob and Gloobinho channels on September 20, 2021.

The series was planned to premiere on Boomerang in Central and Eastern Europe on September 12, 2022, but it was pulled from the schedule and replaced with a rerun of Mr. Bean: The Animated Series.

Merchandise
A comic book based on the series was announced by IDW Publishing in March 2019. It was released in July 2019.

In May 2019, Toy company Basic Fun! announced they had acquired the master toy rights to the Care Bears franchise, with the toys being based on this series. FiGPiNs were released in March 2020.

Notes

References

External links
 
 
  on Boomerang

2010s American animated television series
2020s American animated television series
2019 American television series debuts
2010s Canadian animated television series
2020s Canadian animated television series
2019 Canadian television series debuts
American children's animated adventure television series
American children's animated comedy television series
American children's animated fantasy television series
American flash animated television series
Animated television series about bears
Boomerang (TV network) original programming
Cartoon Network original programming
Cartoonito original programming
Canadian children's animated adventure television series
Canadian children's animated comedy television series
Canadian children's animated fantasy television series
Canadian flash animated television series
English-language television shows
Television about magic